Isma Mugulusi (born 10 October 2003) is a Ugandan professional footballer who plays as a midfielder for Greek Super League 2 club Makedonikos and the Uganda national team.

Personal life 
Isma's older brother Ibrahim is also a footballer.

Honours 
Uganda U20

 Africa U-20 Cup of Nations runner-up: 2021

References 

2003 births
Living people
People from Jinja District
Ugandan footballers
Ugandan expatriate footballers
Association football midfielders
Uganda Premier League players
Super League Greece 2 players
Busoga United FC players
SC Villa players
Makedonikos F.C. players
Ugandan expatriate sportspeople in Greece
Expatriate footballers in Greece
Uganda youth international footballers
Uganda under-20 international footballers
Uganda international footballers